Briareum is a genus of soft corals in the family Briareidae. The coral is cultivated by aquarium owners for its fluorescing polyps, which reveal themselves under actinic light. The genus is in need of extensive examination, as many specimens sold by marketers display unique and similar characteristics, but are often labeled as one species, Pachyclavularia violacea.

Species 
The following species are recognized within the genus:

 Briareum asbestinum (Pallas, 1766)
 Briareum contortum (Kükenthal, 1906)
 Briareum cylindrum Samimi-Namin & van Ofwegen, 2016
 Briareum hamrum (Gohar, 1948)
 Briareum palmachristi Duchassaing & Michelotti, 1860
 Briareum stechei (Kükenthal, 1908)
 Briareum violaceum (Quoy & Gaimard, 1833)

References 

Briareidae
Octocorallia genera